Plebecula is a genus of land snails in the subfamily Geomitrinae of the family Geomitridae.

Species
 Plebecula anaglyptica (Reeve, 1852)
 Plebecula giramica (R. T. Lowe, 1852)
 Plebecula nitidiuscula (G. B. Sowerby I, 1824)
 † Plebecula saxipotens (Wollaston, 1878)
Synonyms
 † Plebecula comatula (F. Sandberger, 1871): synonym of † Pseudoleptaxis comatula (F. Sandberger, 1871) 
 † Plebecula declivis (F. Sandberger, 1870): synonym of † Dentellocaracolus declivis (F. Sandberger, 1870) 
 † Plebecula divisionensis [sic]: synonym of† Plebecula divionensis (J. Martin, 1866) (incorrect subsequent spelling)
 † Plebecula fraasi Jooss, 1912: synonym of † Wenzia fraasi (Jooss, 1912) (new combination)
 † Plebecula ramondi (Brongniart, 1810): synonym of † Wenzia ramondi (Brongniart, 1810)
Taxon inquirendum
 † Plebecula divionensis (J. Martin, 1866)

References

External links
 Lowe, R. T. (1852). Brief diagnostic notices of new Maderan land shells. The Annals and Magazine of Natural History. (2) 9 (50): 112-120; (2) 9 (52): 275-279. London
 Cockerell, T. D. A. (1921). The genus Plebecula Lowe. The Nautilus. 34(4): 133-136.
 Brozzo, A.; Harl, J.; De Mattia, W.; Teixeira, D.; Walther, F.; Groh, K.; Páll‐Gergely, B.; Glaubrecht, M.; Hausdorf, B.; Neiber, M. T. (2020). Molecular phylogeny and trait evolution of Madeiran land snails: radiation of the Geomitrini (Stylommatophora: Helicoidea: Geomitridae). Cladistics. 36(6): 594-616

Geomitridae